"Modern Fiction" is an essay by Virginia Woolf. The essay was published in The Times Literary Supplement on April 10, 1919 as "Modern Novels" then revised and published as "Modern Fiction" in The Common Reader (1925). The essay is a criticism of writers and literature from the previous generation. It also acts as a guide for writers of modern fiction to write what they feel, not what society or publishers want them to write.

Synopsis
In "Modern Fiction", Woolf elucidates upon what she understands modern fiction to be. Woolf states that a writer should write what inspires them and not follow any special method. She believed writers are constrained by the publishing business, by what society believes literature should look like and what society has dictated how literature should be written. Woolf believes it is a writer's job to write the complexities in life, the unknowns, not the unimportant things.

She criticizes H.G. Wells, Arnold Bennett, John Galsworthy of writing about unimportant things and called them materialists. She suggests that it would be better for literature to turn their backs on them so it can move forward, for better or worse. While Woolf criticizes the aforementioned three authors, she praises several other authors for their innovation. This group of writers she names spiritualists, and includes James Joyce who Woolf says writes what interests and moves him.

Woolf wanted writers to focus on the awkwardness of life and craved originality in their work. Woolf's overall hope was to inspire modern fiction writers to write what interested them, wherever it may lead.

Themes

Virginia Woolf as critic

Virginia Woolf was known as a critic by her contemporaries and many scholars have attempted to analyse Woolf as a critic. In her essay, "Modern Fiction", she criticizes H.G. Wells, Arnold Bennett and John Galsworthy and mentions and praises Thomas Hardy, Joseph Conrad, William Henry Hudson, James Joyce and Anton Chekhov.

As a critic, she does not take an analytical point of view and it is believed to be due to the influences of impressionism at the time that she was able to do so. Her writing and criticism was often done by intuition and feelings rather than by a scientific, analytical or systematic method. Virginia Woolf says of criticism:

Woolf speaks of criticism as being vague rather than concrete. In her criticism within "Modern Fiction" of H.G. Wells for instance, she is vague in what is wrong with writings but focuses more on the abstract ideals for his fiction rather his work. Woolf's body of essays offer criticism on a variety and diverse collection of literature in her unsystematic method.

Woolf's analysis of Russian versus British literature
In "Modern Fiction", Woolf takes the time to analyse Anton Chekhov's "Gusev" and in general, how Russians write. Woolf spent time polishing translated Russian texts for a British audience with S.S.Kotelianskii which gave her perspectives she used to analyse the differences between British literature and Russian literature. Woolf says of Russian writers:

To Woolf, Russian writers see something entirely different in life than the British. In comparison to Russian writers and authors, Woolf says of British literature:

Due to Woolf's work in polishing translations, she was able to see the differences between Russian and British authors. Yet she also knew that "from the comparison of two fictions so immeasurably far apart are futile save indeed as they flood us with a view of infinite possibilities of the art". Woolf's main purpose in comparing the two culturally different writers was to show the possibilities that modern fiction would be able to take in the future.

Woolf, writers and fiction
Woolf's "Modern Fiction" essay focuses on how writers should write or what she hopes for them to write. Woolf does not suggest a specific way to write. Instead, she wants writers to simply write what interests them in any way that they choose to write. Woolf suggests, “Any method is right, every method is right, that expresses what we wish to express, if we are writers; that brings us closer to the novelist's intention if we are readers". Woolf wanted writers to express themselves in such a way that it showed life as it should be seen not as "a series of gig lamps symmetrically arranged". She set out to inspire writers of modern fiction by calling for originality, criticizing those who focused on the unimportant things, and comparing the differences of cultural authors, all for the sake of fiction and literature.

References

Works by Virginia Woolf
Essays about literature